Mictopsichia chlidonata is a species of moth of the family Tortricidae. It is found in Peru.

The wingspan is about 11 mm. The ground colour of the forewings is visible in the form of orange basal and subapical streaks accompanied by two short submedian marks at the costa and a darker line edging the subterminal refractive line. The termen is dark orange. The hindwings are orange with brownish terminal markings.

Etymology
The name refers to colouration of the species and is derived from Greek chlidon (meaning a decoration).

References

Moths described in 2009
Mictopsichia
Moths of South America
Taxa named by Józef Razowski